Linnane is a surname. Notable people with the surname include:

Anthony William Linnane (1930–2017), Australian biochemist
Brian F. Linnane (born 1955), the 24th President of Loyola College in Maryland
Noel Hill & Tony Linnane, Irish folk musicians
Steve Linnane, Australian rugby league footballer who played in the 1980s and 1990s, and coached in the 2000s
Sylvie Linnane (born 1956), Irish retired sportsman